Tokarivka is an urban-type settlement in Voznesensk Raion, Mykolaiv Oblast, Ukraine. It belongs to Veselynove settlement hromada, one of the hromadas of Ukraine. The population was

History
Tokarivka was founded as Kolosivka, since originally it was the estate of Princess Kolosova. In 1920, it was renamed Kudriavtsivka to commemorate certain bolshevik Kudriavtsev who was responsible for the local land redistribution after the 1917 October Revolution.
In 1976, Kudriavtsivka was granted urban-type settlement status.

On 19 May 2016, Verkhovna Rada adopted decision to rename Kudriavtsivka to Tokarivka and conform to the law prohibiting names of Communist origin.

Until 18 July 2020, Tokarivka belonged to Veselynove Raion. In July 2020, as part of the administrative reform of Ukraine, which reduced the number of raions of Mykolaiv Oblast to four, Veselynove Raion was merged into Voznesensk Raion.

Economy

Transportation
Kolosivka railway station, located in Tokarivka, is a junction of three lines, which connect it to Mykolaiv, Pomichna (via Voznesensk), and Odesa.

References

Urban-type settlements in Voznesensk Raion